Aframomum uniflorum is a species in the ginger family, Zingiberaceae. It was first described by John Michael Lock and Axel Dalberg Poulsen.

Range
Aframomum uniflorum is native to Tropical Africa, From Northeast Democratic Republic of the Congo to Uganda.

References 

uniflorum